State Road 227 (NM 227) is a , paved, two-lane state highway in Doña Ana County in the U.S. state of New Mexico. NM 227's western terminus is in  Vado at the road's junction with NM 478. The road's eastern terminus is in Vado at Frontage Road 1035 (FR 1035) just east of the road's junction with Interstate 10 (I-10) and U.S. Route 180 (US 180). The road continues as County Road B19 past the junction with FR 1035. NM 227 is also known as Vado Road.

Route description
The highway begins at the junction with NM 478 in southwestern part of Vado, shortly after the NM 28 intersection with NM 189. The road travels east through the fields of Mesilla Valley, past Vado Elementary School and after approximately  turns northeasterly. The highway skirts Vado from the south and reaches its eastern terminus at intersection with FR 1035 just east of the junction with I-10 and US 180.

History
The original section of NM 227 was first built in early 1940s as a connector road between NM 28 south of La Mesa and U.S. Route 85 (US 85, future NM 478). In late 1950s this road was designated as NM 227. In mid-1960s the road was extended all the way to a frontage road west off I-10. In 1988 the New Mexico Department of Transportation (NMDOT) went through a radical road renumbering program, and the La Mesa–Vado stretch was redesignated as NM 189, whereas the Vado to I-10 section remained NM 227. An overpass over I-10 was constructed in 1990. In 2013 the overpass area and Interstate exit were redesigned, and NM 227 was extended to FR 1035.

Major intersections

See also

References

External links

227
Transportation in Doña Ana County, New Mexico